The black drop effect is an optical phenomenon visible during a transit of Venus and, to a lesser extent, a transit of Mercury.

Description
Just after second contact, and again just before third contact during the transit, a small black "teardrop" appears to connect Venus's disc to the limb of the Sun, making it impossible to time the exact moment of second or third contact accurately.  This led to the failure of the attempts during the 18th century transits of Venus to establish a truly precise value for the astronomical unit.

The black drop effect was long thought to be due to Venus's thick atmosphere, and indeed it was held to be the first real evidence that Venus had an atmosphere. However, it is now thought by many to be an optical effect caused by the combination of the extreme darkening of the Sun's disk near its apparent edge and the intrinsic imperfection of the viewing apparatus.

Observing Mercury simultaneously during its transit in May 1832 with different instruments, Bessel and Argelander noticed a black drop effect (though the term had not been coined yet) with that instrument of less resolution. With precise measurements, a black drop effect was observed from outside the Earth's atmosphere during the 1999 and 2003 transits of Mercury, although Mercury has no significant atmosphere.

 transit of Venus, many observers reported that they did not see the black drop effect, or at least that it was much less pronounced than had been reported in earlier centuries' transits. Larger telescopes, better optics, and limb darkening may have been factors.

1832 Mercury transit
The Shuckburgh telescope of the Royal Observatory, Greenwich in London was used for the 1832 transit of Mercury. It was equipped with a micrometer by Dollond and was used for a report of the events as seen through the small refractor. By observing the transit in combination with timing it and taking measures, a diameter for the planet was taken. They also reported the peculiar effects that they compared to pressing a coin into the Sun. The observer remarked:

Gallery

See Also
Shadow blister effect

References

External links 

 The black drop effect
 The "Black Drop" effect—explanation at the TransitOfVenus.org website
 Sky and Telescope: The Disappearing Black Drop
 Video Simulating Black Drop effect using your hand

Astronomical transits
Optical phenomena